In chess, compensation is the typically short-term positional advantages a player gains in exchange for typically  disadvantage.

Forms
Compensation can include:
Better pawn structure.
The "two bishops", which refers to having bishops of both colors while your opponent does not. Almost all modern players consider having both bishops as an advantage, although historically there has been great debate as to how much of an advantage they constitute. The two bishops are most likely to show their power in the endgame.
Better piece  and/or better  (common in gambits).
Having the enemy king exposed to future attack, either due to a loss of pawn cover or being trapped in the center of the board, is often excellent compensation.
Passed pawns are often decisive in the endgame. Connected and/or protected passed pawns are even more deadly.

Examples

Polugaevsky versus Evans

A rook on the seventh rank (the opponent's second rank) is usually very powerful, as it threatens the opponent's unadvanced pawns and hems in the enemy king. A rook on the seventh rank is sufficient compensation for a pawn .  In this position from a game between Lev Polugaevsky and Larry Evans, the rook on the seventh rank enables White to draw, despite being a pawn down .

Spassky versus Fischer

A famous 1960 game between future world champions Boris Spassky and Bobby Fischer began with a King's Gambit opening.  White sacrifices a pawn on his second move:
1. e4 e5 2. f4 exf4 3. Nf3 g5 4. h4 g4 5. Ne5
reaching the position shown (first diagram). Fischer examines an alternate fifth move for Black:

5... h5 6. Bc4 Rh7 7. d4 d6 8. Nd3 f3 9. gxf3 Be7 10. Be3 Bxh4+ 11. Kd2 Bg5 12. f4 Bh6 13. Nc3
reaching the position shown (second diagram), where Fischer explains "White has more than enough compensation for the pawn."

The bishop pair
Possession of the  often yields long-term compensation for sacrificed material.

Berthelot versus Flear

Balashov versus Quinteros

A relatively interesting middlegame has been reached. White is up the exchange, while Black is compensated by two active bishops forming a crisscross pattern.

Bishops of opposite colors

 sometimes give the defender drawing chances in the long run, even if the opponent has a material advantage of one or two pawns or even the exchange.

See also
 Chess piece relative value
 The exchange (chess)

References

Bibliography

Chess terminology